Anton Parsons (born 1968, in Palmerston North) is a New Zealand sculptor. His work often contain letters and numbers, sometimes in Braille or Braille-like codes, these are typically arranged along linear of curvilinear surfaces. Some of his early work consisted of meticulously crafted oversize pencils and other writing equipment. Later he produced a series of works involving oversized Braille often in collaboration with the blind poet Dr. Peter Beatson of Palmerston North. The Braille works were followed by a series of works designed to fit in gallery doorways, they consisted of vertical plastic strips similar to a cheap fly screen.

Education 
Parsons gained a Batchelor of Fine Arts in Sculpture at the Canterbury School of Fine Art in 1990.

Awards and grants 
While at university Parsons was awarded the Rosemary Muller sculpture award and obtained a number of grants in the following years which allowed him to develop his practice.

1990 – Rosemary Muller sculpture award, University of Canterbury
1991 – Q.E.2 Arts Council, Creative projects grant
1993 – Q.E.2 Arts Council, Professional development grant 
1996 – Creative New Zealand, New work development grant

Public commissions 

Parsons has been commissioned to produce a number of site specific sculptures in New Zealand

1992 – Alphabeti, Department of Justice, High Court, Wellington
2002 – Gone Fishing, PriceWaterhouse Coopers Building, Auckland 
2002 – Polyglot, North Shore District Court, Albany
2003 – Invisible City, Lambton Quay, Wellington.
2004 – Analogue, KPMG Building, Tauranga
2007 – Numbers, Coleman Mall, Palmerston North
2011 – Passing Time, Wilson Reserve, Christchurch

Collections 

 Manawatu Art Gallery, Palmerston North
 Govett Brewster Art Gallery, New Plymouth
 Robert McDougal Art Gallery, Christchurch
 Sargent Art Gallery, Wanganui, New Zealand
 Chartwell Collection, Auckland, New Zealand
 Museum of New Zealand, Te Papa Tongarewa

References 

1968 births
20th-century New Zealand sculptors
20th-century New Zealand male artists
21st-century New Zealand sculptors
21st-century New Zealand male artists
Living people
People from Palmerston North